Nocardioides massiliensis is a bacterium from the genus Nocardioides which has been isolated from human feces from Marseille, France.

References 

 

massiliensis
Bacteria described in 2016